Richard B. Frank (born November 11, 1947 in Kansas) is an American lawyer and military historian.

Frank graduated from the University of Missouri in 1969, after which he served four years in the United States Army. During the Vietnam War, he served a tour of duty as a platoon leader in the 101st Airborne Division. In 1976, he graduated from Georgetown University Law Center.

Bibliography
Frank has written several books and articles on the Pacific campaign of World War II and Southeast Asia:

 Guadalcanal: The Definitive Account of the Landmark Battle (1990)—Won the General Wallace M. Greene Award from the U.S. Marine Corps
 Downfall: The End of the Imperial Japanese Empire (1999). .
 MacArthur (2007). .
 "No Bomb, No End", in What If? 2 (2001).
 "Why Truman Dropped the Bomb", The Weekly Standard (August 8, 2005): p. 20.
 "George Polk's Real World War II Record", The Weekly Standard (February 26, 2007)

Notes

External links
  Panel discussion on the 132nd Infantry Regiment at Guadalcanal which included Richard B. Frank at the Pritzker Military Museum & Library on October 23, 2013

1947 births
Living people
20th-century American historians
American male non-fiction writers
21st-century American historians
American military historians
20th-century American male writers